Air Niamey was an airline headquartered in Niamey, Niger and based at Diori Hamani International Airport.

History
It was formed as a successor to Air Niger, previously operating ACMI equipment only during Hajj/Umrah periods, but was then supposed to operate scheduled flights to Jeddah as well as starting domestic operations in Niger. However, Air Niamey meanwhile no longer exists.

Fleet
Air Niamey formerly operated the sole following aircraft:

1 Airbus A320-200

References

Defunct airlines of Niger
Airlines established in 2007
2007 establishments in Niger
Companies based in Niamey